Piet van Heerden (1924 – 1996), was a Dutch sculptor and painter.

Biography
He was born in Haarlem. He became an artist in Haarlem after following training as a painter and sculptor at the Koninklijke Academie voor Schone Kunsten in Antwerp.
 He lived one winter in 1952 with Elsa and Anton Heyboer in 't Paradijsje, the nickname given to the small guild house of the Haarlem Coomanshof. In 1965 his work was shown in Heemstede along with that of his friend Wim Steijn.

He died in Haarlem.

References

Piet van Heerden on Artnet

1924 births
1996 deaths
Dutch male sculptors
Artists from Haarlem
20th-century Dutch sculptors
20th-century Dutch painters
Dutch male painters
20th-century Dutch male artists